The military career of Francisco Franco Bahamonde began on 29 August 1907, when he took the oath as a cadet at the Spanish Toledo Infantry Academy. On 13 July 1910 he graduated from Infantry Academy and was commissioned as a second lieutenant in the Spanish Army, in the same promotion as Juan Yagüe, Emilio Esteban Infantes, Camilo Alonso Vega, José Asensio, Lisardo Doval Bravo and Eduardo Sáenz de Buruaga.  He rose through the ranks over the next twenty years and became one of the most important Spanish commissioned officers of the Rif War. On 31 January 1926 Franco, aged 33, became the youngest general in all of Europe. In January 1928 he was then chosen to direct the newly formed General Military Academy in Zaragoza. From 19 May 1935 to 23 February 1936, Franco was elevated to Chief of Army Staff before the 1936 election moved the leftist Popular Front into power, relegating him to the Canary Islands as Commander of the Archipelago Force. After initial reluctance, he joined the July 1936 military coup which, after failing to take Spain, sparked the Spanish Civil War.

During the war, he commandeered Spain's colonial army in Africa and after the death of much of the rebel leadership became his faction's only leader. On 1 October 1936, in Burgos, Franco was appointed Generalissimo and Head of State. He consolidated all nationalist parties into the FET y de las JONS (creating a one-party state). Three years later the Nationalists declared victory and thereafter ruled over Spain from 1939 until his death in 1975 assuming the title Caudillo.

Styles 
 3 August30 September 1936: "The Most Excellent Divisional general Francisco Franco Bahamonde, Member of the National Defence Board."
 30 September1 October 1936: "His Excellency the Head of the State Government and Generalissimo of the Armies.
 1 October19 December 1936: "His Excellency the Head of the State and Generalissimo of the Armies.
 19 December 1936† 20 November 1975 : "His Excellency the Head of the State, Caudillo of Spain and the Crusade, Generalissimo of the Armies.

Nicknames 

Homo missus a Deo (A man sent from God).
Providential man
Sentinel of the West
Crusader of the West
Prince of the armies
The cleanest sword of the West/Europe
Supreme captain of the Race
Undefeated Caesar 
Saviour of the Fatherland/Spain
The only victor against Marxism on the field of battle 
The youngest general in Europe
Little light of El Pardo

Dates of rank 
 29 August 190713 July 1910: Gentleman Cadet
 13 July 191013 July 1912: Second Lieutenant
 13 June 191215 March 1915: First Lieutenant
 15 March 191529 June 1918: Captain
 29 June 191831 January 1924: Commandant
 31 January 19247 February 1925: Lieutenant Colonel
 7 February 192531 January 1926: Colonel 
 31 January 192629 March 1934: Brigade General
 29 March 1934 18 July 1938: Divisional General
 30 September 1936 † 20 November 1975: Generalissimo of the Armies
 18 July 1938† 20 November 1975: Captain General, Army 
 18 July 1938† 20 November 1975: Captain General, Navy
  7 October 1939† 20 November 1975: Captain General, Air Force

List of assignment  
23 July 19106 February 1912: Second Lieutenant, 8th Infantry Regiment «Zamora»
19 February 191215 April 1913: Second and First Lieutenant, 68th Infantry Regiment «África» 
15 April 191326 March 1915: First Lieutenant, 1st Indigenous Regular Forces of Melilla
26 March7 April 1915:  Captain, Square for Service Eventualities in Ceuta
7 April 19151 January 1917: Captain, 1st Indigenous Regular Forces of Melilla
1 January1 March 1917: Captain, 1st Group of Indigenous Regular Forces of Tétouan
1 March 191727 September 1920 Commandant, 3rd Infantry Regiment «Príncipe»
27 September 19208 June 1923: Chief of the 1st Flag of the Foreigners Tercio
8 June 192311 February 1926: Chief of the Volunteers Tercio
29 April 19268 January 1928: Chief of the 1st Infantry Brigade, 1st Division
8 January 192830 June 1931: Director of the General Military Academy
5 February 193229 March 1934: Chief of the 15th Infantry Brigade
29 March 193415 February 1935: Balearics General Commander
15 February19 May 1935: High Chief of the Military Force in Morocco
19 May 193523 February 1936: Chief of Army Staff
23 February25 July 1936: Canary General Commander
25 July27 August 1936: General of the Army in Morocco and the Southern Spain
27 August30 September 1936: Chief of the Military Force in Morocco and the Expeditionary Force
30 September 1936† 20 November 1975: Commander-in-chief of the Armies/Spanish Armed Forces

Awards

Local government 
Álava:
Vitoria:
Francisco de Vitoria Medal (1947) (HW)  
Predilect Son (1936) (HW) 
Province of Albacete: Gold, Honor and Gratitude Medal of the Provincial Council (1958)
Albacete:  Gold Medal (1945) (HW)
Province of Alicante: Adopted and Predilect Son of the Province (HW) 
Alicante: Gold Medal (1966) (HW)
Denia:
Gold Medal (HW)
Adopted Son (HW)
Jijona: Adopted Son (1940) (HW) 
Ondara: Adopted Son (HW)
Orihuela:
Medal of the City
Covered Gentleman
San Juan:
Gold Medal (1974) (HW)
Adopted Son (1940) (HW)
Santa Pola: Adopted Son (1940) (HW)
Sax: Adopted Son (1940) (HW) 
Villena: Adopted Son (1940) (HW) 
Province of Almería: Provincial Gold Medal (1956) (HW)
Almería: Honorary Mayor (HW)
Huércal-Overa: Honorary Pro-man of the Comarcal Sindical Brotherhood of Farmers and Ranchers (1946)
Province of Ávila:
Ávila: Honorary Mayor (HW)
Province of Badajoz:
Badajoz: Gold Medal (HW)
Mérida: Gold Medal (HW)
Balearic Islands:
Palma de Mallorca: Gold Medal (1946) (HW)
Deyá: Adopted Son (1936) (HW)
Mahón: Gold Medal (1949) (HW) 
Mancor del Valle: Adopted Son (1936) (HW) 
San Lorenzo del Cardezar: Adopted Son (1937) (HW) 
Province of Barcelona:
Barcelona:
Gold Medal (HW) 
25 Years of Peace Local Commemorative Medal (1964) (HW)
Molins de Rey: Gold Medal (1973) (HW) 
Biscay:
Brilliants Medal of the Provincial Council (1950) (HW)   
First Biscayan of Adoption and Honour (1950) (HW)   
Bilbao: 
Gold Medal (1939) (HW)  
Honorary Mayor (1939) (HW) 
Baracaldo: Gold Medal (1950) (HW) 
Durango: Gold Medal (1972) (HW) 
Guernica:
Brilliants Medal (1937) (HW) 
Adopted Son (1966) (HW) 
Orduña:
Brilliants Medal (1961) (HW)  
Perpetual Honorary Mayor (1967) (HW)  
Santurce: Gold Medal (1971) (HW)    
Sestao:
Gold Medal (1966) (HW) 
Adopted Son (1966) (HW)
Province of Burgos:
Burgos:
Gold Medal (HW)
Honorary Mayor (HW)
Province of Cáceres: Provincial Gold Medal (1954) (HW)
Cáceres: 
Gold Medal (1951) (HW)
Freedom of the City (HW)
Plasencia: 
Gold Medals (1945) (HW) (1964) (HW) (1971) (HW)
Province of Cádiz: Gold Plate (1948) (HW)
Cádiz: Gold Medal (1975-2008, Posthumous)
Barbate: Perpetual Honorary Mayor (HW)
Chiclana de la Frontera:
Gold Medal (HW)
Adopted Son(HW)
Puerto Real:
Gold Medal (HW)
Adopted and Predilect Son (HW)
El Puerto de Santa María:
Gold Medal (1962) (HW)
Honorary Mayor (1964) (HW)
San Fernando:
Gold Medal (1950)
Perpetual Honorary Mayor (1951)
San Roque: Gold Medal (1950) (HW)
Sanlúcar de Barrameda:
Gold Medal (1961) (HW)
Perpetual Honorary Mayor (1972) (HW) 
Province of Castellón:
Castellón: Gold Medal (HW)
Burriana: Gold Medal (1968) (HW)
Vall de Uxó:
Gold Medal (HW)
Adopted Son (HW)
Province of Ciudad Real:
Almadén: Gold Medal (1953) (HW)
Puertollano: Honorary Mayor (HW)
Socuéllamos: Perpetual Honorary Mayor (HW)
Tomelloso: (HW)
Gold Medal (1973) (HW)
Perpetual Honorary Mayor (1967) (HW)
Province of Córdoba: Gold Medal of the Provincial Council (1961) (HW)
Baena: Gold Medal (1946) (HW)
Cabra: Gold Medal (1961) (HW)
Province of La Coruña:
Predilect Son of the Province (1936) (HW)
Galician Ex-Combatant Medal (1943) (HW)
Honorary President of the Provincial Council (1944) (HW)
La Coruña:
Gold Medal (HW)
Honorary Mayor (HW)
Betanzos:
Gold Medal
Adopted Son  
Ferrol:
Gold Medal (HW)
Honorary Mayor (HW)
Predilect Son (HW)
Santiago de Compostela: Gold Honor Medal (1946) (HW)
Province of Cuenca:
Honorary President of the Provincial Council (HW)
Adopted Son of the Province (HW) 
Cuenca:
Gold Medal (1951) (HW) 
Honorary Mayor (1947) (HW)  
Predilect Son (1941) (HW)  
Adopted Son (1951) (HW) 
Province of Gerona:
Honorary President of the Provincial Council (1944) (HW) 
Gerona: Perpetual Honorary Mayor (1964) (HW) 
Blanes: Gold Medal (1964) (HW) 
Figueras: Honorary Mayor (1964) (HW)   
Province of Granada: Gold Medal of the Provincial Council (1956) (HW) 
Motril: Gold Medal (1963)
Baza:
Gold Medal (1946) (HW)
Adopted Son (1946) (HW)
Santa Fe: Adopted Son (1936) (HW)  
Province of Guadalajara: Gold Medal of the Provincial Council (1959) (HW)
Guadalajara: Gold Medal (1959) (HW)
Guipúzcoa: 
San Sebastián: Gold Medal (1939) (HW) 
Anzuola: Honorary Mayor (HW)  
Arechavaleta: Honorary Mayor (HW) 
Eibar: Honorary Mayor (1949) (HW)
Elgoibar: Honorary Mayor (1936) (HW)
Elgueta: Honorary Mayor (1936) (HW)
Mondragón: Honorary Mayor (HW)
Oñate: Honorary Mayor (HW) 
Pasajes: Honorary Mayor (1949) (HW) 
Rentería: Honorary Mayor (HW)  
Vergara: Honorary Mayor (HW)  
Zarauz: Honorary Mayor (1949) (HW)  
Zumaya: Honorary Mayor (HW)
Province of Huelva:
Huelva: 
Gold Medal (1943) (HW)
Honorary Mayor (1943) (HW)
Adopted Son (1943) (HW)
Aljaraque: Honorary Mayor (1966) (HW) 
Almonte: Honorary Mayor (1956) (HW) 
Gibraleón: Honorary Mayor (HW) 
Nerva: Perpetual Honorary Mayor  (1966) (HW) 
San Juan del Puerto: Honorary Mayor (1956) (HW) 
Valverde del Camino: Perpetual Honorary Mayor  (1966) (HW)
Zalamea la Real: Perpetual Honorary Mayor  (1966) (HW)
Province of Huesca:
Gold Medal of the Provincial Council (1953) (HW)
Adopted Son of the Province (1953) (HW)
Huesca:
Perpetual Honorary Mayor (1953) (HW)  
Adopted Son (1953) (HW)
Barbastro:
Gold Medal (1953) (HW)
Honorary Mayor (1953) (HW)
Adopted Son (1953) (HW)
Binéfar: 
Gold Medal (1969) (HW)
Honorary Mayor (1969) (HW)
Monzón: 
Perpetual Honorary Mayor (1953) (HW)
Adopted Son (1953) (HW)
Province of Jaén:
Gold Medal of the Provincial Council (1957) (HW)
Honorary President of the Provincial Council (1945) (HW)
Adopted Son of the Province (1939) (HW)
Andújar:
Gold Medal (1952) (HW)
Perpetual Honorary Mayor (1960) (HW)
Úbeda: Gold Medal (1965) (HW)
Province of León:
Extraordinary Gold Medal of the Provincial Council (1960) (HW)
Honorary President of the Provincial Council (1945) (HW)
Adopted Son of the Province (1939) (HW) 
Provincial Combatant Medal, extraordinary category (1964) (HW)
León
City Medal with Laurels (1952) (HW) 
Ponferrada:
Gold Medal (1949) (HW) 
Honorary Mayor (1949) (HW)
Villablino: Gold Medal (1971) (HW)
Province of Lérida:
Gold Medal of the Provincial Council (1947) (HW)
Honorary President of the Provincial Council (1942) (HW)
Lérida: Gold Medal (1941) (HW)
Seo de Urgel: Gold Medal (1966) (HW)
Province of Logroño: Gold Medal of the Provincial Council (1954) (HW) 
Logroño: Gold Medal (1936) (HW) 
Province of Lugo:
Gold Medal of the Provincial Council (1958) (HW) 
Honorary President of the Provincial Council (1944) (HW)
Lugo:
Honorary Mayor (1939) (HW)
Perpetual Honorary Mayor (1954) (HW)
Mondoñedo: Gold Medal (1949) (HW)
Province of Madrid:
Madrid:
Gold Medal (HW)
Honor Medal (HW)
Honorary Mayor (HW)
Adopted Son (HW)
Aranjuez: Gold Medal (1970) (HW) 
Coslada: Honorary Mayor (1967) (HW)
Chinchón: Gold Medal (1951)
Getafe:
Gold Medal (1972) (HW)
Perpetual Honorary Mayor  (1972) (HW)
Pinto: Gold with Brilliants Point (1949) (HW)
Province of Málaga:
Gold Medal of the Provincial Council (1964) (HW) 
Honorary President of the Provincial Council (1946) (HW)  
Málaga:
Gold Medal (1946) (HW)  
Honorary Mayor (1943) (HW)  
Adopted and Predilect Son (1937) (HW)
Marbella: Gold Medal (1965) (HW) 
Ronda:
Gold Medal (1967) (HW)
Adopted Son (1967) (HW)
Vélez-Málaga:
Gold Medal (1964) (HW)
Adopted Son (HW)
Province of Murcia: Gold Medal of the Provincial Council (1946)
Murcia:
Gold Medal (1946) (HW)
Águilas: Gold Medal (1968)
Cartagena: Gold Medal (1945) (HW)
Lorca: Gold Medal (1965)
Province of Orense: Gold Medal of the Provincial Council (1957) (HW)
Orense:
Gold Medal (1946) (HW)
Adopted Son (1946) (HW)
Carballino: Gold Medal (1961) (HW)
Province of Oviedo:
Oviedo:
Gold Medal (1964) (HW)
Adopted Son (1934) (HW)
Castrillón:
Gold Medal (1968) (HW)
Predilect Son (1968) (HW)
Gijón:
Gold Medal (1962) (HW)
Adopted Son (1939) (HW)
Honorary Mayor (1939) (HW)
Llanes: Gold Medal (1967) (HW) 
Province of Palencia: Gold Medal of the Provincial Council (HW)
Palencia: Gold Medal (1941) (HW)
Province of Las Palmas: Gold Medal of the Provincial Council (1952) (HW)
Las Palmas de Gran Canaria:
Gold Medal (1969) (HW)
Honorary Mayor (1943) (HW)
Gran Canaria: 
Honorary President of the council (1945) (HW)
Council Medal of the Ex-Combatant (1942) (HW)
Fuerteventura:  
Council Gold Medal (1960) (HW) 
Honorary President of the council (1945) (HW)
Arucas: Gold Medal (1950) (HW)
Telde:
Gold Medal (1975) (HW)
Adopted Son (1936) (HW)
Province of Pamplona - Former Kingdom of Navarre:
Extraordinary Gold Medal (1939) (HW)
Gold Medal of the Provincial Council (1974) (HW)
Adopted Son of Navarre (1974) (HW)
Pamplona: Adopted and Predilect Son (HW)
Esteribar: Adopted Son (1948) (HW)
Huarte-Araquil: Adopted and Predilect Son (1948) (HW)
Lumbier: Adopted Son (1948) (HW)
Marcilla: Adopted Son (1948) (HW)
Miranda de Arga: Adopted Son(HW)
Province of Pontevedra: Perpetual Honorary President of the Provincial Council (1952) (HW)
Pontevedra: Gold Medal (1944) (HW)
Tuy: Gold Medal (1968) (HW) 
Vigo: Platinum Medal (1945)
Villagarcía de Arosa: Gold Medal (1965) (HW)
Province of Salamanca: Gold Medal of the Provincial Council (1954) (HW)
Salamanca: Gold Medal (1948) (HW)
Peñaranda de Bracamonte: Perpetual Honorary Mayor (1974) (HW)
Province of Segovia: Gold Medal of the Provincial Council (1957) (HW)
Segovia: Gold Medal (1939) (HW)
Province of Santa Cruz de Tenerife:
Santa Cruz de Tenerife: 
Gold Medal (1939) (HW)
Predilect Son (1939) (HW)
Tenerife: Adopted Son (1936) (HW)
Candelaria: Adopted Son (1936) (HW)
San Cristóbal de La Laguna: Gold Medal (1966)  (HW)
Hermigua:
Gold Medal (1946) (HW)
Adopted Son (1936)  (HW)
Los Llanos de Aridane:
Gold Medal (1950)  (HW)
Honorary Mayor (1950)  (HW)
Adopted Son (1936)  (HW)
La Orotava
Gold Medal (1939) (HW)
Predilect Son (1939) (HW)
El Paso:
Province of Santander: 
Santander:
Gold Medal (1952) (HW)
Honorary Mayor (1946) (HW)
Freedom of the city (1968) (HW) 
Torrelavega:
Honorary Mayor (HW)
Province of Seville:
Gold Medal of the Provincial Council (1967) (HW)
Honorary President of the Provincial Council (1946) (HW)
Seville:
Gold Medal (HW)
Life Honorary Mayor (HW)
Almadén de la Plata: Honorary Mayor (1946) (HW) 
Bollullos de la Mitación: Adopted Son (HW) 
Cazalla de la Sierra:
Adopted and Predilect Son (1951) (HW) 
Dos Hermanas: 
Honorary Mayor (HW) 
Adopted Son (HW)
Écija: Predilect Son (1936) (HW) 
El Madroño:  
Honorary Mayor (1946) (HW)
Adopted Son (1946) (HW)
Mairena del Alcor: Adopted Son (1936) (HW) 
Pedrera: Honorary Mayor (1946) (HW) 
San Juan de Aznalfarache: Perpetual Honorary Mayor (1964) (HW) 
Province of Soria: Gold Medal of the Provincial Council (1948) (HW) 
Soria: 
Gold Medal (1939) (HW)
Honorary Mayor (1939) (HW)
Covaleda: Honorary Mayor (1946) (HW) 
Province of Tarragona: 
Gold Medal of the Provincial Council (1951) (HW)  
Perpetual Honorary Mayor of all municipalities of the Province (1964) (HW)
Tarragona:  
Gold Medal (1952) (HW)
Amposta: Gold Medal (1963) (HW) 
Reus:
Gold Medal (1943)
Honorary Mayor (1964)
Province of Teruel:
Teruel: Perpetual Honorary Mayor (1967)  (HW)
Alcañiz: 
Gold Medal (1946) (HW)
Honorary Councilor (1946) (HW)
Province of Toledo: Gold Medal of the Provincial Council (1972) (HW) 
Toledo:
City Gold Medal (1939) (HW)
Alcázar Gold Medal (1961) (HW)
Mora: Gold Medal of the Olive Tree Party (1966) (HW)
Province of Valencia:
Gold Medal of the Provincial Council (HW)
Honorary President of the Provincial Council (HW)
Valencia: 
Gold Medal (1942) (HW)
Honorary Mayor (1939) (HW) 
Algemesí:
Gold Medal (1946)
Honorary Mayor (1946) 
Adopted and Predilect Son (1946)
Casinos:
Perpetual Honorary Mayor (1946) (HW)
Adopted Son (1946) (HW)
Catarroja: Gold Medal (1972) (HW) 
Gandia: Predilect Son (1946) (HW) 
Játiva: 
Perpetual Honorary Mayor (1946) (HW)
Honorary and Predilect Son (1946) (HW)
Onteniente:
Perpetual Honorary Mayor (HW)
Adopted and Predilect Son (HW)
Puebla de Vallbona: 
Perpetual Honorary Mayor (1946) (HW)
Predilect Son (1946) (HW) 
Sagunto: Gold Medal (1965) (HW) 
Sueca:
Perpetual Honorary Mayor (1946) (HW)  
Honorary and Predilect Son (1946) (HW)  
Province of Valladolid: Diamonds Medal of the Provincial Council (1952) (HW)  
Valladolid: Honorary Mayor (1939) (HW)     
Province of Zamora:
Zamora: Gold Medal (1949) (HW)  
Benavente:  
Gold Medal (1969) (HW) 
Adopted Son (1958) (HW) 
Honor Citizen (1936) (HW)  
Santibáñez de Vidriales: Adopted Son (1958) (HW)   
Province of Zaragoza:
Zaragoza:
Calatayud: Gold Medal (1951) (HW)   
Ceuta:
Gold and Brilliants Medal
Perpetual Honorary Mayor (1939)
Predilect Son

Private corporations 
Fútbol Club Barcelona:
Palau Blagurana Inauguration Commemorative Gold Medal  (1971) (HW)
Club 75 Anniversary Gold Medal (1974) (HW)

Scholastic

Honorary doctorates 
: 
Pontifical University of Salamanca, Canon Law, 1954.
University of Santiago de Compostela, Sciences, 1965 (HW). 
University of Salamanca, Law, 1966.
: 
University of Coimbra, Law, 1949.

Honorific eponyms

Localities 
Badajoz: Esparragosa del Caudillo (HEW), Gévora del Caudillo (HEW), Guadiana del Caudillo (HEW) and Villafranco del Guadiana 
Cáceres: Albalá del Caudillo  (HEW), Alagón del Caudillo (HEW) and Tiétar del Caudillo (HEW) 
Ciudad Real: Llanos del Caudillo and Villanueva de Franco (HEW) 
Córdoba: Bembézar del Caudillo (HEW) 
La Coruña: Ferrol del Caudillo (HEW)  
Jaén: Guadalén del Caudillo (HEW) and Guadalimar del Caudillo (HEW)  
León: Bárcena del Caudillo (HEW)  
Málaga: Villafranco del Guadalhorce 
Salamanca: Águeda del Caudillo (HEW) 
Seville: El Viar del Caudillo (HEW) and Villafranco del Guadalquivir (HEW) 
Teruel: Campillo de Franco (HEW)  
Toledo: Alberche del Caudillo
Zaragoza: Bardena del Caudillo (HEW)

Institutions and public infrastructures 
Alcobendas, Madrid: «Generalísimo Franco» School (HEW)  
Alhama de Murcia: «Francisco Franco» School (HEW)  
Arrecife, Las Palmas: «Generalísimo Franco» Scholar Group (HEW)
Barcelona:
«Francisco Franco» Health City of Social Security (HEW) 
Autonomous University: «Francisco Franco» School of Sanitary Technical Assistants (HEW)
Beariz, Orense: «Francisco Franco» School (HEW)   
Benagéber, Valencia: Generalissimo Dam
Cádiz: «Generalísimo Franco» Institution of Feminine Labor Teaching  (HEW)  
La Coruña: «Generalísimo Franco» School (HEW)
Ciudad Real: «Generalísimo Franco» School (HEW) 
Getafe, Madrid: «Francisco Franco» Public School (HEW)  
Jerez, Cádiz: «Generalísimo Franco» School (HEW) 
Madrid:
«Francisco Franco» City Scholars (HEW) 
«Francisco Franco» Provincial Health City (HEW)
«Generalísimo Franco» Military Hospital (1950-2001)
Málaga: «Francisco Franco» Professional School (HEW)  
Parla, Madrid: «Francisco Franco» School (HEW)   
Rosell, Castellón: «Generalísimo Franco» School (HEW) 
San Pedro del Pinatar, Murcia: «Francisco Franco» School (HEW)  
Santa Cruz de Tenerife: «Generalísimo Franco» Public School (HEW)   
Seville: «Generalísimo Franco Franco» National School (HEW)
Numerous avenues, streets, centers, schools, institutes and squares called "Generalísimo Franco", "Francisco Franco" or "Caudillo" of various cities and towns in the country, most of them renamed since the times of the transition to democracy.

Foundation 
Francisco Franco National Foundation

Awards 
National Literature Prize «Francisco Franco» (1940-1975)
Spanish National Research Council (Suppressed)
«Francisco Franco» Prizes for Spanish Literature
«Francisco Franco» Prize for Sciences
«Francisco Franco» Prize for Individual Technical Investigation
«Francisco Franco» Prize for Team Technical Research

Other 
EFE News Agency

See also 
Francisco Franco
Francoist Spain
Symbols of Francoism
List of titles and honours of Juan Carlos I of Spain

Notes 
(HW): Honour posthumously withdrawn
(HEW): Honorific eponym withdrawn

References

Bibliography  
 
 
 
 
Matilde Eiroa San Francisco, Matilde Acción exterior y propaganda. Las visitas de líderes latinoamericanos a Franco [Foreign action and propaganda. The visits of Latin American leaders to Franco]. Mexico. Revista de estudios Latinoamericanos [On-line]. No.54 (Jan./Jun. 2012). ISSN 2448-6914 (in Spanish).
 
Prieto Barrio (2011). Cruces del Mérito Militar, Naval, War Cross (Spain), Collective Military Medal and African campaigns. Condecoraciones Militares. Retrieved 2 October 2020 (in Spanish).

Francisco Franco
Franco, Francisco
Franco, Francisco
Spanish generals
Spanish captain generals
Captain generals of the Navy
Air captain generals
Commanders in chief

Laureate Cross of Saint Ferdinand
Recipients of the Military Medal (Spain)
Grand Masters of the Order of Isabella the Catholic
Commanders by Number of the Order of Isabella the Catholic
Recipients of the Civil Order of Alfonso X, the Wise
Grand Masters of the Royal and Military Order of San Hermenegild
Grand Crosses of the Royal and Military Order of San Hermenegild
Grand Crosses of Military Merit
Crosses of Military Merit
Crosses of Naval Merit
Crosses of Aeronautical Merit

Bailiffs Grand Cross of Honour and Devotion of the Sovereign Military Order of Malta
Collars of the Order of the Liberator General San Martin
Grand Crosses of the Order of Aviz
Recipients of the Philippine Legion of Honor
Recipients of the Order of the Crown (Italy)
Knights Grand Cross of the Order of Saints Maurice and Lazarus
Commandeurs of the Légion d'honneur
Grand Crosses of the Order of Christopher Columbus
Knights Grand Commander (Senangapati) of the Order of Rama
Recipients of the Order of Saint Lazarus